The Latin maxim , meaning "we do not know and will not know", represents the idea that scientific knowledge is limited. It was popularized by Emil du Bois-Reymond, a German physiologist, in his 1872 address  ("The Limits of Science").

Seven "World Riddles" 

As he saw it, science was bounded by two limits: the ultimate nature of matter and the enigma of consciousness. Eight years later, in a speech before the Prussian Academy of Sciences, he expanded his list of conundrums to seven "world riddles" or "shortcomings" of science. Three of these he declared to be "transcendent", or permanently unknowable: "1. the ultimate nature of matter and energy, 2. the origin of motion, ... 5. the origin of simple sensations."

Hilbert's reaction 

David Hilbert, a widely-respected German mathematician, suggested that such a conceptualization of human knowledge was too pessimistic, and that by considering questions unsolvable we limit our understanding.

In 1900, during an address to the International Congress of Mathematicians in Paris, Hilbert suggested that answers to problems of mathematics are possible with human effort.  He declared, "in mathematics there is no ", and he worked with other formalists to establish foundations for mathematics during the early 20th century.

On 8 September 1930, Hilbert elaborated his opinion in a celebrated address to the Society of German Scientists and Physicians, in Königsberg:

Answers to some of Hilbert's Program of 23 problems were found during the 20th century. Some have been answered definitively; some have not yet been solved; a few, most notably Cantor's continuum hypothesis, have been shown to be undecidable on the basis of currently accepted principles.

In 1931, Gödel's incompleteness theorems showed that for any formal system of mathematics satisfying certain minimal requirements, there exist questions that cannot be answered within that system. While this does not exclude that the question can be answered unambiguously in another system, the incompleteness theorems are generally taken to imply that Hilbert's hopes for proving the consistency of mathematics using purely finitistic methods were unfounded. As this excludes the possibility of an absolute proof of consistency, there must always remain an ineliminable degree of insecurity about the foundations of mathematics: we will never be capable of knowing, once and for all, with a certainty unimpeachable even by the most stout skepticism, that there is no contradiction in our basic theories. (Note that this does not mean that such skepticism is rational; it only means that it cannot be refuted with absolute rigour.)

Other responses 

This was in regards to Friedrich Wolters, one of the members of the literary group "George-Kreis". Lepenies thought that Wolters misunderstood the degree of pessimism being expressed about science, but understood the implication that scientists themselves could be trusted with self-criticism.

Haeckel overstated his charge: du Bois-Reymond had never supported the Catholic Church, and far from professing humility he reminded his audience that while our knowledge was indeed bounded by mysteries of matter and mind, within these limits "the man of science is lord and master; he can analyze and synthesize, and no one can fathom the extent of his knowledge and power".

The issue of whether science has limits continues to attract scholarly attention.

William James has referred to this maxim in his lecture "Reflex action and theism" in relating it to agnosticism, which gives man no practical tools for his volitions.

The Quarterly Review also regarded the maxim as the ensign of agnosticism:To the average citizen who reads as he runs, and who is unacquainted with any tongue save his native British, it may well appear that the Gospel of Unbelief, preached among us during the last half-century, has had its four Evangelists–the Quadrilateral, as they have been called, whose works and outworks, demilunes and frowning bastions, take the public eye, while above them floats the agnostic banner with its strange device, ‘Ignoramus et Ignorabimus.’

See also
 Acatalepsy
 Hubris
 I know that I know nothing
 Ignorance management
 Ignotum per ignotius
 List of Latin phrases
 Strong agnosticism
 Unknown unknown

Notes

Epistemology of science
Philosophical phrases
Latin words and phrases
Concepts in epistemology
Ignorance
Skepticism
1870s  neologisms
Quotations from literature
Quotations from philosophy